Charles-François Delamarche (August 1740 – 31 October 1817) was a French geographer and mapmaker.

One of the most important French geographers and mapmakers of the second half of the eighteenth century. Successor to Nicolas Sanson (1600–1667), Robert de Vaugondy (1686–1766), and Rigobert Bonne (1727–1794), whose atlases he reprinted. Also taught geography. In addition to maps and globes, his works include a treatise on the use of the sphere and celestial and terrestrial globes. In the treatise, he illustrates both the Ptolemaic and Copernican systems, as well as listing all the ancient and modern constellations. His son Félix Delamarche (18th century – 1st half 19th century) continued his work.

Works

References 

 Museo Galileo. "Charles-François Delamarche". Catalogue of the Museo Galileo's Instruments on Display. catalogue.museogalileo.it

French scientific instrument makers
18th-century French scientists